The Caucasus Army, was a Russian army which was a part of the White movement during the Russian Civil War. It operated from May 1919 to January 1920, in the Tsaritsyn - Saratov area.

History 

On 23 January 1919, the Volunteer Army was renamed Volunteer Army of the Caucasus. And on 22 May 1919, the Volunteer Army of the Caucasus was divided in two armies: The Caucasus Army, which advanced along the Tsaritsyn-Saratov line and the Volunteer Army, which advanced along the Kursk-Oryol line.

The Caucasus Army was composed of 4 corps and 1 cavalry division: 
 1st Kuban Corps (Gen. Pokrovsky)
 2nd Kuban Corps (Gen. Ulaguy, later Gen. Nahumenko)
 4th Corps (Gen. Shatilov, later Gen. Toporkov)
 5th Corps (Gen. Józefovic)

On 5 July 1919, the Caucasus Army had 23.234 men, but 3 months later it only counted 15.079 men after the transfer of the 2nd Corps to the Don Army; along with 384 machineguns, 85 pieces of artillery, 15 airplanes and 7 armoured trains.

On 29 January 1920, the Caucasus Army was dissolved and succeeded by the Kuban Army.

Commanders of the Caucasus Army 

 Lieutenant-general Pyotr Wrangel (21 May — 8 December 1919)
 Lieutenant-general Viktor Pokrovsky (9 December 1919 — 8 February 1920)

Sources 
 

Military units and formations of White Russia (Russian Civil War)
Russian Civil War